Ekrukhe is a village in Rahata taluka of Ahmednagar district in the Indian state of Maharashtra.

Population
As of 2011 census, population of village is 5,311, of which 2,767 are males and 2,544 are females.

Transport

Road
Shirdi - Shani Shingnapur state highway and Rahata - Chitali road passes thorough a village.

Rail
Chitali railway station is nearest railway station to village.

Air
Shirdi Airport is the nearest airport to village

List of villages in Rahata taluka

References 

Villages in Ahmednagar district